McGillin's Olde Ale House is a tavern in Philadelphia, Pennsylvania. Opened in 1860, McGillin's is the oldest drinking establishment in the city. It is located on Drury Street, an alley connecting 13th Street and South Juniper Street, between Chestnut Street and Sansom Street, in Center City.

History
The famous pub, officially initially called The Bell in Hand opened its doors in 1860 in the home of Irish immigrant William "Pa" McGillin, the owner and operator of the establishment.  It was nicknamed McGillin's by those who frequented the establishment, and the bar took on the title as its official name.  "Pa" McGillin operated the establishment until his death in 1901.  Then his wife Catherine, known as "Ma" McGillin continued running the business, which had grown to encompass the oyster house next door as well as the remainder of the McGillin's house, displacing her 13 children.  "Ma" ran the restaurant until her own death in 1937, at age 90.

After Ma's death, the tavern was run by her daughter, Mercedes McGillin Hooper, until 1958, when she sold it to Henry Spaniak and Joe Shepaniak, brothers and experienced bartenders (who used different spellings of their last names). Since 1993, the bar has been owned by Henry's daughter, Mary Ellen Spaniak Mullins, and her husband Chris Mullins. Their son, Christopher Mullins, Jr., also helps run the day-to-day operations.

The ceramic tile floor (main floor), though not original to the bar, was installed by "Pa" McGillin because he was "tired of replacing the wooden floors because of wear and tear from workers' boots. William got the idea from a local butcher shop—little wear and tear, easy to clean."

There is a ship bell and a cow bell behind the bar which the bartenders ring when they get a great tip. They also ring it to "gong" or "boo" a bad karaoke singer. During a Philadelphia Phillies, Philadelphia Eagles of Philadelphia Sixers, Philadelphia Union or Philadelphia Flyers game, it can be expected that the bell will be rung when the home team scores.

The political website PoliticsPA named it to their list of restaurants frequented by politicians.

In 2013, Gourmet magazine called McGillin's one of the 3 coolest bars in the United States. In  2007, the national trade magazine Nightclub and Bar included McGillin's in its Editors' Choice Top 100 bars and clubs in the United States. The list is based on annual revenue, effective marketing and advertising, uniqueness to market and other factors. Many media outlets have called McGillin's one of America's most authentic Irish pubs in the nation, including USA Today, HuffPost, Fodor's, The Daily Meal, MSN, and Orbitz.

Notable paraphernalia

McGillin's has become the home to a sizable collection of historical Philadelphia paraphernalia including:

 A catalogue of every Liquor License held by the pub since 1871, saved by William McGillin and each successive owner.
 The original "Bell in Hand" sign, the original sign that William "Pa" McGillin had designed for the pub when it originally opened.  "The sign has survived through the years and is an amazing carved piece of wood of an arm ringing a bell - you can almost hear the crier calling the public to McGillin's!"
 The John Wanamaker's "signature" logo sign from the original Wanamaker's Department Store at 13th and Market Streets.
 The Strawbridge & Clothier "Seal of Quality" logo sign from the Market Street Store - Presented to McGillin's by Peter Strawbridge, the founder's great-grandson.
 Gimbel's Department Store tiled subway sign.
 Lit Brothers Department Store tiled subway sign.
 F.W. Woolworth's tiled subway sign indicating the defunct Market Street store.
 A Corestates Financial Group sign.
 A Le Bec Fin sign.
 Crusader's Bank sign.
 There are also several hand-drawn scenes of McGillin's and Philadelphia drawn by various artists through the 1960s and 1970s.

Gallery

See also

 List of the oldest restaurants in the United States
 Market East, Philadelphia, Pennsylvania
 King George II Inn
 List of sites of interest in Philadelphia

References

Further reading

External links
 

Restaurants in Philadelphia
Irish-American culture in Philadelphia
Irish-American culture in Pennsylvania
Taverns in Pennsylvania
Restaurants established in 1860
Center City, Philadelphia